Kenneth Lee Irby (November 18, 1936 – July 30, 2015) was an American poet. He won a 2010 Shelley Memorial Award.

He is sometimes associated with the Black Mountain poets, especially with Robert Duncan, Robert Creeley, and Ed Dorn.

He was born in Bowie, Texas, and In 1940 he moved to Fort Scott, Kansas with his family. He graduated from the University of Kansas, from Harvard University with an A.M., and from the University of California, Berkeley with a M.L.S. degree. He was a visiting professor at the University of Copenhagen on a Fulbright grant. 
Irby's last role was as a Professor of English at the University of Kansas.

A colloquium held at the University of Kansas on November 5, 2011 honored Irby's work, on the occasion of his 75th birthday. Contributions were made by fellow poets Joseph Harrington, Denise Low, Benjamin Friedlander, Pierre Joris, and Lyn Hejinian.

He died on 30 July 2015 at Lawrence Memorial Hospital.

Works
  
  
 Studies, First Intensiy Press, 2001,  
 Ridge to Ridge, Other Wind Press, 2001,  
 Antiphonal and Fall to Fall, Kavyayantra Press, 1994
 Call Steps, Station Hill/Tansy, 1992; Midpoint Trade Books Inc, 1997,  
 Orexis, Station Hill, 1981,  
 Catalpa, Tansy Press, 1977
 Archipelago, Tuumba Press, 1976
 To Max Douglas, Tansy Peg Leg Press, 1974
 Relation: poems, 1965-1966, Black Sparrow, 1970.
 The flower of having passed through paradise in a dream: poems, 1967, Kelly, 1968

References

External links
 "Kenneth Irby", Penn Sound
  University of Buffalo review of Irby's poems
  Arcturus Editions: by Kenneth Irby
 Kenneth Irby at Poets & Writers
 

1936 births
2015 deaths
University of California, Berkeley School of Information alumni
Harvard University alumni
University of Kansas faculty
Academic staff of the University of Copenhagen
University of Kansas alumni